The Energy of Sound is a 1998 album created by Trance Atlantic Air Waves, a side project of Michael Cretu. Cretu worked alongside Jens Gad during the recording of the album. Out of the ten songs in the album, only three were original as the rest were all cover versions.

Track listing
 "Lucifer" (Parsons, Woolfson) – 3:53
 "Axel F" (Harold Faltermeyer) – 3:52
 "Crockett's Theme" (Jan Hammer) – 3:45
 "Dance with the Devil" (Dennys, Hayes) – 3:53
 "Addiction Day" (Jens Gad) – 4:56
 "Magic Fly (Wonderland Mix)" (Ecama) – 6:17
 "Chase" (Giorgio Moroder) – 3:37
 "Twelve After Midnight" (Gad) – 5:02
 "L-42" (Gad, Michael Cretu) – 4:31
 "Pulstar" (Vangelis) – 6:09

Singles
 1997 – "Magic Fly"
 1998 – "Chase"
 1998 – "Crockett's Theme"

See also
 Enigma (musical project)
 Sandra (singer)

References

Enigma (German band)
Trance Atlantic Air Waves albums
1998 albums